Major General Daniel Francis McDaniel,  is a senior officer in the Australian Army. He served as the acting Special Operations Commander Australia from September 2013 to December 2014, after Major General Gus Gilmore was reassigned. He was seconded to the United States Army Pacific as Deputy Commanding General – North from January 2019 to January 2022.

Military career
McDaniel entered the Royal Military College, Duntroon, as an officer cadet in 1988. On graduating in 1989, he was commissioned a lieutenant in the Royal Australian Infantry Corps and posted to the 1st Battalion, Royal Australian Regiment. In 1993 he served on exchange with the British Army of the Rhine.

McDaniel has spent the majority of his career with special forces or assigned to special operations, having first passed selection and been posted to the Special Air Service Regiment (SASR) in 1994. He commanded the first squadron from the SASR to be deployed to Afghanistan in 2001, was Commanding Officer of Special Operations Task Group IV in Afghanistan from April to September 2007, commanded the SASR from 2007 to 2008, and was posted back to Afghanistan in 2009 as Deputy Commander International Security Assistance Force (ISAF) Special Operations Forces. McDaniel was awarded the Distinguished Service Medal in 2002 for his leadership in Afghanistan the previous year, and received the Distinguished Service Cross in 2008 in recognition of his distinguished command of Special Operations Task Group IV.

In between his operational and command postings, McDaniel has filled staff positions within Special Operations Command, Joint Operations Command and Forces Command. Following his return from Afghanistan in 2010, McDaniel was posted to Headquarters Forces Command as Colonel Plans. He was subsequently promoted brigadier and assigned as Deputy Special Operations Commander Australia. In September 2013, after Major General Gus Gilmore was reassigned, McDaniel was appointed acting Special Operations Commander Australia. He served in the position until December 2014, when Major General Jeff Sengelman was assigned the command. For his "exceptional service" with the ISAF, Forces Command and as acting Special Operations Commander Australia, McDaniel was appointed a Member of the Order of Australia in the 2015 Australia Day Honours.

McDaniel was subsequently posted as Director General of Capability Investment Analysis at Australian Defence Headquarters. On 4 January 2019, he was seconded to the United States Army Pacific to serve as Deputy Commanding General – North. He succeeded fellow Australian, Major General Roger Noble, in the role.

McDaniel holds a Bachelor of Management from Southern Cross University, a Master of Management from the University of Canberra and a Master of Arts from Deakin University. He is also a graduate of the Australian Command and Staff College.

Personal life
McDaniel is the son of Dale and Daniel Nolan McDaniel. Daniel senior was an officer in the Australian Army who, following service in the Vietnam War, raised the first counter-terrorist squadron of the SASR and retired as a lieutenant colonel. McDaniel is married and has one son.

References
Footnotes

Bibliography
 

|-

Australian generals
Australian military personnel of the War in Afghanistan (2001–2021)
Deakin University alumni
Living people
Members of the Order of Australia
Recipients of the Distinguished Service Cross (Australia)
Recipients of the Distinguished Service Medal (Australia)
Recipients of the Meritorious Unit Citation
Royal Military College, Duntroon graduates
Southern Cross University alumni
University of Canberra alumni
Year of birth missing (living people)